NGC 4762 is an edge-on lenticular galaxy in the constellation Virgo. It is at a distance of 60 million light years and is a member of the Virgo Cluster. The edge-on view of this particular galaxy, originally considered to be a barred spiral galaxy, makes it difficult to determine its true shape, but it is considered that the galaxy consists of four main components — a central bulge, a bar, a thick disc and an outer ring. The galaxy's disc is asymmetric and warped, which could be explained by NGC 4762 mergering with a smaller galaxy in the past. The remains of this former companion may then have settled within NGC 4762's disc, redistributing the gas and stars and so changing the disc's morphology.

NGC 4762 contains a Liner-type active galactic nucleus, a highly energetic central region. This nucleus is detectable due to its particular spectral line emission, allowing astronomers to measure the composition of the region.

NGC 4762 forms a non-interacting pair with the galaxy NGC 4754.

References

External links 

  NED entry on NGC 4762

Lenticular galaxies
LINER galaxies
Virgo (constellation)
Virgo Cluster
4762
08016
43733